SC Ritzing is an Austrian football club who currently play in the 4th tier Landesliga Burgenland.

Honours 
Austrian Regional League East
Winner (1): 2014–15

Current squad
As of 8 July 2016.

Club staff

 Manager: Stefan Rapp
 Assistant manager: Dietmar Heger
 Business manager: Robert Hochstaffl

See also 
 Football in Austria

External links 
 
 Official website

References 

Football clubs in Austria
Association football clubs established in 1962
1962 establishments in Austria